ν Pegasi, Latinized as Nu Pegasi is a single star in the northern constellation of Pegasus. It is an orange-hued star that is faintly visible to the naked eye with an apparent visual magnitude of 4.84.

This is an aging giant star, most likely (94% chance) on the red giant branch, with a stellar classification of K4III. It is a suspected variable, with a magnitude range observed from 4.83 to 4.86. With the supply of hydrogen at its core exhausted, the star has cooled and expanded to 24.6 times the Sun's radius.

References

K-type giants
Suspected variables
Pegasus (constellation)
Pegasi, Nu
BD+04 4800
Pegasi, 22
209747
109068
8413